Walter Charles Hagen (December 21, 1892 – October 6, 1969) was an American professional golfer and a major figure in golf in the first half of the 20th century. His tally of 11 professional majors is third behind Jack Nicklaus (18) and Tiger Woods (15). Known as the "father of professional golf," he brought publicity, prestige, big prize money, and lucrative endorsements to the sport.<ref>Murry R. Nelson, ed., Encyclopedia of Sports in America: A History from Foot Races to Extreme Sports' (2009) 1:179–80.</ref>  Hagen is rated one of the greatest golfers ever.

Hagen won the U.S. Open twice, and in 1922 he became the first native-born American to win The Open Championship, and won the Claret Jug three more times. He also won the PGA Championship a record-tying five times (all in match play), and the Western Open five times when it had near-major championship status. Hagen totaled 45 PGA wins in his career, and was a six-time Ryder Cup captain.

Early years
Born in Rochester, New York, Hagen came from a working-class family of German descent. His parents were William and Louisa (Boelke) Hagen. His father worked as a millwright and blacksmith in Rochester's railroad-car shops. Walter was the second of William and Louisa's five children and the only son.

Hagen developed his golf game at the Country Club of Rochester, beginning as a caddie, and earned money to help support his family from pre-teen age. He earned ten cents per round and was occasionally tipped another five cents. Hagen played golf at every chance he got; caddie access to the course was limited to off-peak times, as it was elsewhere in the U.S. during that era. Hagen, with assistance from head professional Alfred Ricketts, gradually improved his golf skill to the stage where he was an expert player by his mid-teens, and was then hired by the club to give lessons to club members and to work in the pro shop. He made his top-class professional debut at age 19 at the 1912 Canadian Open, placing 11th, a good showing. Hagen followed up with a surprise 4th place showing at the 1913 U.S. Open at Brookline where he stated that he was treated badly by the other professionals who knew nothing about him.  Hagen said "they pushed me off the tee and told me I could practice when they were through". He vowed to play in the 1914 U.S. Open and "win it", and he did exactly that.

Hagen was also very skilled at baseball, primarily as a pitcher and shortstop. He canceled a 1914 tryout for the Philadelphia Phillies in order to play in a golf tournament. Later that week, Hagen was the U.S. Open Champion, and his career was changed forever.

Raises stature of golf professionals
Hagen was a key figure in the development of professional golf. He emerged in an era when the division between amateurs and professionals was often stark, with the amateurs having the upper hand in some sports, golf among them. This was especially true in Great Britain, the leading country in competitive golf when Hagen began his career. Golf professionals were not allowed to partake of the facilities of the clubhouse, and were not allowed to enter the clubhouse by the front door. On one occasion, at the 1920 British Open in  Deal, Kent, Hagen hired a Pierce-Arrow car to serve as his private dressing room, because he was refused entrance to the clubhouse dressing room. He hired a chauffeur, and parked the expensive car in the club's driveway; this behavior raised a few eyebrows in class-conscious Britain. On another occasion, he refused to enter a clubhouse to claim his prize because he had earlier been denied entrance. In the 1914 Midlothian Open he brazenly entered the clubhouse and mingled with the rich members—they were delighted and the episode permanently opened the doors. The 1920 U.S. Open in Toledo marked a turning point; the players, encouraged by Hagen, donated a large grandfather clock to the host Inverness Club, in appreciation of the club allowing access for the professionals to their clubhouse during the tournament.

Hagen represented the Country Club of Rochester early in his professional competitive career; he was well supported by its members and management for his external competitive ventures. Beginning in 1918, Walter Hagen served as the first club professional at the now legendary Oakland Hills Country Club, in Bloomfield Hills, Michigan, northwest of Detroit. He worked for Oakland Hills until 1919, and then became the first touring professional unaffiliated with a club, a status he held alone for several years.  In 1924, Hagen was president and co-owner of the Bear Creek Golf and Country Club associated with Jack Taylor's Pasadena-On-The-Gulf development in St. Petersburg, Florida. Due to influence from the public, the name was changed to the Boca Ciega Golf and Country Club and ultimately the Pasadena Yacht and Country Club.

Style, wealth

Hagen was a dashing and assertive character who raised the status of professional golfers and improved their earnings as well. Throughout his career, he played hundreds of exhibition matches, all across the United States and around the world; these tours popularized golf to an immense degree. Hagen was also widely known for his dashing wardrobe while playing; this featured expensive tailored clothes in bright colors and plush fabrics. As one of the world's top players, Hagen found his skills were much in demand with this exhibition format, and concluded it was much more lucrative than playing most tournaments.

Hagen also made significant money endorsing golf equipment, and played a major role in helping to design clubs for Wilson Sports, which bore his name (either "Walter Hagen" or "Haig Ultra"). His work with Wilson produced some of the first matched sets of irons, around the same time that his great rival Bobby Jones was performing similar work for the Spalding company. The improved equipment expanded golf's appeal, brought high-quality clubs within the price range of many more players, and raised the standard of play.

Hagen was the first golfer to earn a million dollars in his career. He said he "never wanted to be a millionaire, just to live like one". Hagen once expressed his creed in these words: "Don't hurry, don't worry, you're only here for a short visit, so be sure to smell the flowers along the way." Gene Sarazen, who was ten years Hagen's junior commented, "All the professionals ... should say a silent thanks to Walter Hagen each time they stretch a check between their fingers. It was Walter who made professional golf what it is." On the notion of golf as a financial endeavor, Hagen wrote in his autobiography, "My game was my business and as a business it demanded constant playing in the championship bracket, for a current title was my selling commodity."

Death
Hagen battled throat cancer for over four years and had several operations. A month earlier at the PGA Championship in Colorado, he expressed support for Palmer, saying he was a member of "Arnie's Army."

Hagen died in 1969 at age 76 at his home in Traverse City, and now rests at the Holy Sepulchre Mausoleum in Southfield, Michigan, next to his grandson. His pall bearers included Palmer.

Legacy

In 2000, Hagen was ranked as the seventh greatest golfer of all time by Golf Digest magazine. Hagen was ranked as the eighth greatest player of all time by Sports Illustrated / Golf Magazine in a major 2010 ranking.

Major victories:
U.S. Open: 1914, 1919
The Open: 1922, 1924, 1928, 1929
PGA Championship: 1921, 1924, 1925, 1926, 1927

There is some debate among golf historians as to whether Hagen should actually be credited with 16 major championships, second only to Jack Nicklaus and one ahead of Tiger Woods. (However, counting the U.S. Amateur, which is no longer considered a major championship, Woods' three U.S. Amateurs titles give him a total of 18, two behind Nicklaus's 20.) Hagen captured the Western Open five times (1916, 1921, 1926, 1927, and 1932), at a time when the Western Open was considered one of the premier events on the world golf schedule, second only to the U.S. and British Opens.

Hagen captained the United States in the first six Ryder Cups, and played on the first five U.S. teams: 1927, 1929, 1931, 1933, and 1935.

Hagen has been inducted into the World Golf Hall of Fame, in the charter class of 1974.

Hagen has been portrayed by Bruce McGill in the 2001 movie The Legend of Bagger Vance, and by British actor Jeremy Northam in the 2004 Bobby Jones biopic Bobby Jones: Stroke of Genius.

Professional wins (58)
PGA Tour wins (45)

1914 (1) U.S. Open
1916 (3) Metropolitan Open, Shawnee Open, Western Open
1918 (1) North and South Open
1919 (2) U.S. Open, Metropolitan Open
1920 (3) Florida West Coast Open, Metropolitan Open, Bellevue Country Club Open
1921 (2) Western Open, PGA Championship
1922 (4) Deland Open Championship, Florida West Coast Open, White Sulphur Springs Open, British Open
1923 (5) Texas Open, Florida West Coast Open, Asheville-Biltmore Open Championship, North and South Open, Kansas Mid-Continent Pro Championship (tie with Joe Kirkwood, Sr.)
1924 (5) North and South Open, Metropolitan PGA, British Open, PGA Championship, Princess Anne C.C. Open
1925 (1) PGA Championship
1926 (4) Florida West Coast Open, Eastern Open Championship, Western Open, PGA Championship
1927 (2) Western Open, PGA Championship
1928 (2) British Open, Long Beach Open (December)
1929 (3) Miami International Four-Ball (with Leo Diegel), British Open, Great Lakes Open
1931 (2) Coral Gables Open (tie with Henry Ciuci), Canadian Open
1932 (2) Western Open, St. Louis Open
1933 (1) Tournament of the Gardens Open
1935 (1) Gasparilla Open-Tampa
1936 (1) Inverness Invitational Four-Ball (with Ky Laffoon)

Major championships are shown in bold.

Other wins (13)(This list is incomplete)1914 Professional and Amateur Four Ball Invitational
1914 Pinehurst Amateur-Pro
1915 Massachusetts Open, California State Open, Panama Exposition Open
1920 French Open
1921 Michigan Open
1922 New York Open
1923 Long Beach Open
1924 Belgian Open
1929 Virginia Beach Open
1930 Michigan PGA Championship
1931 Michigan PGA Championship

Major championships
Wins (11)Note: The PGA Championship was match play until 1958 
1 Defeated Mike Brady in an 18-hole playoff – Hagen 77 (+6), Brady 78 (+7)

Results timeline

NYF = tournament not yet founded
NT = no tournament
WD = withdrew
DQ = disqualified
DNQ = did not qualify for match play portion
R64, R32, R16, QF, SF = round in which player lost in PGA Championship match play
"T" indicates a tie for a place

Source for The Masters:  www.masters.com

Source for U.S. Open: USGA Championship Database

Source for The Open Championship:  www.opengolf.com

Source for PGA Championship:  PGA Championship Media Guide

Summary

Most consecutive cuts made – 31 (1913 U.S. Open – 1930 U.S. Open)
Longest streak of top-10s – 15 (1923 PGA Championship – 1929 Open Championship)

See also

List of golfers with most PGA Tour wins
List of men's major championships winning golfers
List of golfers with most wins in one PGA Tour event

References

Further reading
 
 
 
 Houck, Davis W. "Hagen, Walter Charles" American National Biography (1999) online
 
 Mazzucco, Claudia, ed. Legendary Lessons: More Than One Hundred Golf Teachings from Walter Hagen, Bobby Jones, Grantland Rice, Harry Vardon, and More'' (Skyhorse Publishing, 2016). excerpt

External links
 

Walter Hagen's Home
Detroit Athletic Co. –  Like Gatsby, Michigan golfing legend Hagen lived a glamorous life

American male golfers
PGA Tour golfers
Winners of men's major golf championships
Ryder Cup competitors for the United States
World Golf Hall of Fame inductees
Golfers from New York (state)
Golfers from Michigan
Sportspeople from Rochester, New York
Sportspeople from Traverse City, Michigan
American people of German descent
1892 births
1969 deaths